Tomáš Bucháček (born March 7, 1978 in Neplachovice) is a Czech cyclist, who last rode for UCI Continental team .

Major results

2001
 8th Overall Herald Sun Tour
2002
 10th Overall Herald Sun Tour
2004
 6th Grand Prix Kooperativa
 9th Overall Tour de Bohemia
1st Stage 2
2005
 2nd Road race, National Road Championships
 5th Grand Prix Bradlo
2006
 2nd Grand Prix Bradlo
 4th Overall Dookoła Mazowsza
1st Mountains classification
 7th Overall Tour of Bulgaria
1st Stage 9
 8th Overall Okolo Slovenska
 8th Memoriał Andrzeja Trochanowskiego
2007
 1st  Road race, National Road Championships
 3rd Overall Tour du Loir-et-Cher
1st Stage 2
 6th Overall Circuit des Ardennes
1st Stage 2
 6th GP Kranj
 7th Overall Tour de Serbie
2010
 2nd Overall Czech Cycling Tour
 2nd Memoriał Henryka Łasaka
 5th Overall Tour of Bulgaria
 10th Overall Istrian Spring Trophy
2011
 6th Overall Tour du Loir-et-Cher
1st Stage 4
 6th Poreč Trophy
 7th Overall Course de la Solidarité Olympique
1st Stage 1
 8th Overall Czech Cycling Tour
 9th Overall Szlakiem Grodów Piastowskich
2012
 3rd Tour Bohemia
 6th Overall Czech Cycling Tour
1st Stage 1 (TTT)
 6th Overall Szlakiem Grodów Piastowskich
 6th Grand Prix Královéhradeckého kraje
 8th Puchar Uzdrowisk Karpackich
 9th Time trial, National Road Championships
2013
 5th Overall Okolo Jižních Čech
 7th Overall Czech Cycling Tour
 7th Overall Okolo Slovenska
2014
 National Road Championships
7th Time trial
7th Road race
 7th Memoriał Andrzeja Trochanowskiego
 10th Overall Okolo Jižních Čech
2015
 9th Overall East Bohemia Tour
2016
 Visegrad 4 Bicycle Race
4th GP Czech Republic
5th Kerékpárverseny
9th GP Polski
10th GP Slovakia
 5th Overall Dookoła Mazowsza
 National Road Championships
6th Time trial
7th Road race
 10th Overall CCC Tour - Grody Piastowskie
2017
 1st Stage 1 (TTT) Czech Cycling Tour
 5th Overall Okolo Slovenska
 6th Szlakiem Wielkich Jezior
 National Road Championships
7th Road race
8th Time trial
 9th Memoriał Romana Siemińskiego
 10th GP Slovakia
2018
 National Road Championships
5th Time trial
9th Road race

References

External links

1978 births
Living people
Czech male cyclists